In 1948 Toms discovered by experiments that the addition of a small amount of polymer into a turbulent Newtonian solvent (parts per million by weight), which
results in a Non-Newtonian fluid solution, can reduce the skin frictional drag on a stationary
surface by up to 80% . This technology has been successfully
implemented to reduce pumping cost for oil pipelines, to increase the flow rate in
fire fighting equipment and to help irrigation and drainage (Sellin & Ollis, 1980;
Khalil et al., 2002). It also has potential applications in the design of ship and submarine
hulls to achieve an increased speed and reduced energy cost.

See also 
 Drag reducing agent
 FENE-P
 Non-Newtonian fluid
 Direct numerical simulation

External links 
 Alyeska Pipe Line
 EFFECTS OF FRICTION AND POLYMERS ON 2D TURBULENCE

References 
Toms, B. 1948 Observation on the flow of linear polymer solutions through
straight tubes at large Reynolds numbers. Proc. Int’l Rheological Congress 2,
135–141

Sellin, R. H. J. & Ollis, M. 1980 Polymer drag reduction in large pipes and
sewers: Results of recent field trials. Journal of Rheology

Khalil, M. F., Kassab, S. Z., Elmiligui, A. A. & Naoum, F. A. 2002
Applications of drag-reducing polymers in sprinkler irrigation systems: Sprinkler
head performance. Journal of Irrigation and Drainage Engineering

Perlekar P, Mitra D, Pandit R. Manifestations of drag reduction by polymer additives in decaying, homogeneous, isotropic turbulence. Physical review letters. 2006. 

Jin S 2007 Numerical simulations of a dilute polymer solution in isotropic turbulence PhD Thesis Cornell University, Ithaca, NY

Liberzon A., Guala M., Lüthi B., Kinzelbach W. and Tsinober A. Dilute polymers in turbulence Physics of Fluids, 17, 031707, 2005 link

Liberzon A., Guala M., Kinzelbach W., and Tsinober A. On turbulent kinetic energy production and dissipation in dilute polymer solutions Physics of Fluids 18, 125101, 2006 link

Liberzon A., Guala M., Holzner M., Lüthi B., and Kinzelbach W. On turbulent entrainment and dissipation in dilute polymer solutions, Physics of Fluids, 21, 035107, 2009 link

Polymers